The Roman Catholic Diocese of Zacapa (y Santo Cristo de Esquipulas) is a Latin suffragan diocese in the ecclesiastical province of the Archdiocese of Guatemala.
 
Its cathedral episcopal see is catedral San Pedro (dedicated to saint Peter), in Zacapa. It also had a virtual Co-cathedral, Basílica del Cristo Negro de Esquipulas, which is officially still the cathedral of the Territorial Prelature of Santo Cristo de Esquipulas.

History 
It was erected 10 March 1951, as the Diocese of Zacapa, on territory split off from the Archdiocese of Guatemala (still its Metropolitan].

On 16 September 1956, it lost territory to establish the Territorial Prelature of Santo Cristo de Esquipulas, and again on 30 April 1968 to establish the then Apostolic Administration of Izabal.

It was (re)united aeque principaliter (in permanent personal union) with the Territorial Prelature of Santo Cristo de Esquipulas on 24 June 1986 and since assumed the name Diocese of Zacapa y Santo Cristo de Esquipulas.

It enjoyed a papal visit from Pope John Paul II in February 1996.

Bishops

Episcopal ordinaries
 Apostolic Administrator Miguel Ángel García y Aráuz (1951 – 1955.11.30), while first Bishop of Jalapa (Guatemala) (1951.04.11 – 1987.01.29); previously Titular Bishop of Sophene (1944.05.16 – 1951.04.11) & Auxiliary Bishop of Archdiocese of Guatemala (1944.05.16 – 1951.04.11)
 Costantino Cristiano Luna Pianegonda, Friars Minor (O.F.M.) (1955.11.30 – 1980.02.16)
 Rodolfo Quezada Toruño (1980.02.16 – 2001.06.19), succeeding as former Coadjutor Bishop of Zacapa (1975.09.11 – 1980.02.16); also Bishop-Prelate of the Territorial Prelature of Santo Cristo de Esquipulas (1986.06.24 – 2001.06.19), President of Episcopal Conference of Guatemala (1988–1992); previously Titular Bishop of Gadiaufala (1972.04.05 – 1975.09.11) & Auxiliary Bishop of Zacapa (1972.04.05 – 1975.09.11); later Metropolitan Archbishop of Guatemala (2001.06.19 – 2010.10.02), President of Episcopal Conference of Guatemala (2002–2006), Cardinal-Priest of S. Saturnino (2003.10.21 [2004.03.13] – 2012.06.04)
 José Aníbal Casasola Sosa (2004.05.13 – 2007.04.27), also Bishop-Prelate of Santo Cristo de Esquipulas (Guatemala) (2004.05.13 – 2007.04.27)
 Rosolino Bianchetti Boffelli (2008.11.20 – 2012.09.14), also Bishop-Prelate of Santo Cristo de Esquipulas (Guatemala) (2008.11.20 – 2012.09.14); later Bishop of Quiché (Guatemala) (2012.09.14 – ...)
 Vacant see (sede vacante): 2012–2016
 Ángel Antonio Recinos Lemus (2016.02.22 – present); until then Subcoordinator of COPADENA for the Roman Catholic Diocese of Jalapa and Pastor of the "Nuestra Señora de Lourdes" (Our Lady of Lourdes) Parish, in El Progreso Achuapa, Jutiapa

Coadjutor bishop
Rodolfo Quezada Toruño (1975-1980); future Cardinal

Auxiliary bishop
Rodolfo Quezada Toruño (1972-1975), appointed Coadjutor here; future Cardinal

Other priest of this diocese who became bishop

Domingo Buezo Leiva, appointed Vicar Apostolic of Izabal in 2013

External links and references

Sources and external links
 GigaCatholic, with incumbent biography links

References

Zacapa y Santo Cristo de Esquipulas
Zacapa y Santo Cristo de Esquipulas
Zacapa y Santo Cristo de Esquipulas
1951 establishments in Guatemala
Roman Catholic Ecclesiastical Province of Santiago de Guatemala